Khartoum College of Medical Sciences is a medical school, in Khartoum, the capital of Sudan. It was established in 1999 with three faculties: Medicine, Dentistry and Clinical Pharmacy. At the second national higher education exhibition, the college was awarded the trophy for the best equipped higher education institution in Sudan. The college started 3 more programs in the following years: Medical Laboratory Technology, Physiotherapy and Dental Technology
The institution was founded in 1999 by Professor Nasr Al-adeen, who he died in 2021.

Universities and colleges in Sudan